Prior to its uniform adoption of proportional representation in 1999, the United Kingdom used first-past-the-post for the European elections in England, Scotland and Wales. The European Parliament constituencies used under that system were smaller than the later regional constituencies and only had one Member of the European Parliament each. The constituency of Cumbria and Lancashire North was one of them.

When it was created in England in 1984, it consisted of the Westminster Parliament constituencies of Barrow and Furness, Carlisle, Copeland, Lancaster, Morecambe and Lunesdale, Penrith and the Border, Westmorland and Lonsdale, Workington, and Wyre. In 1994, Wyre constituency was transferred to Lancashire Central, but otherwise the constituency's composition remained the same until its abolition in 1999.

References

External links
 David Boothroyd's United Kingdom Election Results

European Parliament constituencies in England (1979–1999)
Politics of Cumbria
Politics of Lancashire
1984 establishments in England
1999 disestablishments in England
Constituencies established in 1984
Constituencies disestablished in 1999